The  was an American alternative rock band from New York City often associated with the shoegazing scene, with members who later joined Luna and Fountains of Wayne.

History
The band was formed by singers/guitarists Britta Phillips and Jody Porter in 1990. They added Mark Browning, before relocating to London in 1990, where they recorded their debut EP Exploration Day, with Terry Bickers acting as producer. Though considered part of the "shoegazing" genre, in reality they were more pop-oriented, gaining comparisons with artists including The Cure, The Sundays, and Swervedriver. The song "Exploration Day" was named by the NME as "single of the week". Two more singles followed before the band's only album, Popdropper, was released in 1992.  Phillips and Porter returned to the United States and recruited Adam Schlesinger on bass, although there would only be one further release, the "Underwatertown" single in 1995, before the band split up in 1996.

Porter later performed with Fountains of Wayne, for whom Schlesinger played bass, and later formed Astrojet. Schlesinger also played with Ivy. Phillips joined Ultrababyfat, and later Ben Lee and Luna, after which she continued a partnership with Dean Wareham.

Members 
Jody Porter - vocals/guitar
Britta Phillips - vocals/guitar
Nino Dmytryszyn - drums
Mark Browning - bass/vocals

Discography

Singles, EPs
Exploration Day EP (1991) Ultimate
Tour 7" (1991)
"(Lost) In Hollow" (1991) Ultimate (also released as a promo in the US on east West)
"Flight" (1992) Ultimate
"Underwatertown" (1995) Scratchie

Albums
Popdropper (1992) Ultimate/East West

References

External links
The  (US Band) At The Forgotten Band Planet
 The  discography on Forgotten Band Planet

Musical groups established in 1990
Musical groups disestablished in 1996
American shoegaze musical groups
Dream pop musical groups
Alternative rock groups from New York (state)